Monks Risborough railway station is a small, single platform railway station of the village of Monks Risborough in Buckinghamshire, England.

Passenger services from this station are operated by Chiltern Railways.

History
The Great Western Railway opened the station on 11 November 1929 as Monks Risborough and Whiteleaf Halt.

The station was transferred from the Western Region of British Rail to the London Midland Region on 24 March 1974.

Services
For much of the day, an hourly service operates directly between Marylebone and Aylesbury. Previously until May 2017, during the morning and evening peaks Chiltern Railways operated an additional shuttle service between Princes Risborough and Aylesbury using a Class 121 "bubble car" heritage unit. This is now operated by either a two-car or three-car Class 165.

The station platform is above road level, and is accessible by both ramp and steps.   Formerly equipped with both a Fast Ticket ticket machine and a permit to travel ticket machine, refurbishment of the platform surface required their removal; they have not been reinstated.  Passengers must buy tickets from on-board staff or at their destination.

Monks Risborough village adjoins the town of Princes Risborough and the station is on the short branch line that links Princes Risborough with Aylesbury.

References

External links

 Chiltern Railways

Former Great Western and Great Central Joint Railway stations
Railway stations in Buckinghamshire
DfT Category F2 stations
Railway stations in Great Britain opened in 1929
Railway stations served by Chiltern Railways
Princes Risborough